George IX (sometimes known as George VII) (1718–1778), of the Bagrationi Dynasty, was King of Imereti in 1741. The third son of George VII of Imereti by his wife Tamar (daughter of Mamia III Gurieli), he was enthroned after his brother Alexander V was ousted in the Ottoman-sponsored coup. Later that year, he was rescinded and Alexander regained the crown. George went into exile to his father-in-law George Lipartiani in Mingrelia, but was allowed to return to Imereti during the reign of his nephew, Solomon I.

George IX was married to Mzekhatun, daughter of Prince Giorgi Lipartiani. They had two sons and three daughters:
 Princess Elene (1745–1810), who was married to Giorgi (died 1787), son of Rostom, Duke of Racha.
 Prince Rostom (fl. 1746)  
 Princess Mzekhatun (1748–1810), who was married to Prince Papuna Tsereteli (died 1790).
 David II (1755–1795), King of Imereti (1784–1789).
 Princess Darejan (1757–1810), who was married to Prince Simon Abashidze (died c. 1790).

References

 Вахушти Багратиони (Vakhushti Bagrationi) (1745). История Царства Грузинского: Жизнь Имерети.
David Marshall Lang, The Last Years of the Georgian Monarchy, 1658-1832. New York: Columbia University Press, 1957.

1718 births
1778 deaths
Bagrationi dynasty of the Kingdom of Imereti
Kings of Imereti
18th-century people from Georgia (country)
Eastern Orthodox monarchs